Sound barrier may refer to:
Sound barrier, the transition at transonic speeds from subsonic to supersonic travel, usually referring to flight
The Sound Barrier, a British 1952 film directed by David Lean
Sound Barrier, a heavy metal band from Los Angeles
Sound Barrier (film), a 2005 Iranian film
Noise barrier, an exterior structure designed to protect sensitive land uses from noise pollution